Cypress Inn is an unincorporated community in Wayne County, Tennessee, United States.  It is located near the Alabama state line and is along the Natchez Trace Parkway.

History
Historical records state that the Cypress Inn was the name of an inn along the Natchez Trace.  The area grew into a community; even though the inn no longer exists, the name of the community is Cypress Inn. Much of the land has been owned by the same families for generations.  Local families include Braunius, Holt, Dodd, Berry, Darby, Montgomery, and Pigg.

Volunteer Fire Department
Cypress Inn Volunteer Fire Department

Nearby Cities
Collinwood, Tennessee
Cloverdale, Alabama
Iron City, Tennessee
Waterloo, Alabama
Florence, Alabama

Nearby Unincorporated Communities
Lutts, Tennessee

Highways and Parkways
 Tennessee State Route 227
Natchez Trace Parkway

References

Unincorporated communities in Wayne County, Tennessee
Unincorporated communities in Tennessee
Natchez Trace